The Queens Kings were the Toronto Blue Jays' Short-Season A classification team in the New York–Penn League in the 2000 season.  The team was formerly the St. Catharines Stompers and was sold by the Blue Jays and relocated to Queens, New York City, New York and played at The Ballpark at St. Johns. The following season (2001), the team moved to the New York City borough of Brooklyn and became the Brooklyn Cyclones, an affiliate of the New York Mets. Of note, Alex Ríos, who earned a spot on the 2006 and 2007 American League All Star Roster, played his first season in professional baseball with the Queens Kings. Other former Queens Kings to reach the majors include Cleveland Indians catcher Guillermo Quiróz and former pitcher Brandon Lyon. Mike Smith (Blue Jays and Twins) also played for the Kings.

Franchise record 

Defunct New York–Penn League teams
Defunct baseball teams in New York City
Professional baseball teams in New York (state)
Toronto Blue Jays minor league affiliates
Baseball teams established in 2000
Sports clubs disestablished in 2000
2000 establishments in New York City
2000 disestablishments in New York (state)
Sports in Queens, New York
Defunct baseball teams in New York (state)
Baseball teams disestablished in 2000